Edmund Swetenham (15 November 1822 – 19 March 1890) was a British barrister and Conservative Party politician.

Early life 
Swetenham was born in Somerford Booths, Cheshire, in 1822, to Clement Swetenham, a gentleman, of Sumerford Booths Hall, and his wife Eleanor (née Buchanan).

He studied at Macclesfield Grammar School and Brasenose College, Oxford, and was called to the bar in 1848.

Career

Barristerial work 
Swetenham was called to the Bar at Lincoln's Inn in 1848 and chose to work in the North Wales region of the Wales and Chester Circuit. He became one of the most prominent barristers in the region, defending or prosecuting in many of the most famous cases of his time, including defending railway employees charged with manslaughter after the Abergele Railway disaster in 1869.

He famously prosecuted publisher Thomas Gee for libel. Gee had revealed in his newspaper The Flag that a local farmer had voted for the Conservative Party in the General Election of that year, and this led to the eviction of the farmer from his property in protest.

Swetenham also defended the Dolgellau man Cadwaladr Jones in 1877, who stood accused of murdering his girlfriend. Jones went on to be hung.

He was promoted to Queen's Counsel (QC) in 1880.

Political career 
At the 1885 General Election, Swetenham stood in the Caernarfon Boroughs constituency for the Conservatives, losing by 65 votes. He stood again in the 1886 General Election, being elected by a majority of 136 votes against Liberal MP Sir Love Jones-Parry, who was incumbent.

Personal life 
He was twice married, first in 1851 to Elizabeth Jane, daughter of Wilson Jones. Jones was from Hartsheath Park, Mold, and was the former MP 1835–1841 for Denbigh Boroughs. Edmund and Elizabeth had one son and two daughters.

Swetenham remarried in 1867. He married Gertrude, daughter of Ellis Cunliffe of Acton Park, Wrexham. They had one son and one daughter; Gertrude died in 1876.

References

External links 
 
 Mr Edmund Swetenham Former MP, Caernarvon District of Boroughs at TheyWorkForYou website

1822 births
1890 deaths
Conservative Party (UK) MPs for Welsh constituencies
Alumni of Brasenose College, Oxford
British barristers
People educated at The King's School, Macclesfield
UK MPs 1886–1892